Nigali Sagar (also called Nigliva, Nigali Sagar pillar, Nighihawa pillar, Nigliva pillar, or Araurakot pillar) is an archaeological site in Nepal containing the remains of a pillar of Ashoka. The site is located in Nigalihawa, about 20 kilometers northwest of Lumbini and 7 kilometers northeast of Taulihawa. Another famous inscription discovered nearby in a similar context is the Lumbini pillar inscription.

Discovery
The pillar was discovered in 1893 by a Nepalese officer on a hunting expedition. The pillar and its inscriptions (there are several inscriptions on it, from Brahmi to Medieval) were researched in March 1895 by Alois Anton Führer. Führer published his discovery in the Progress Report of the Archaeological Survey Circle, North-West Province, for the year ending on June 30, 1895. The fact that the inscription was discovered by Führer, who is also known to have forged Brahmi inscriptions on ancient stone artefacts, casts a doubt on the authenticity of this inscription.

The pillar was not erected in-situ, as no foundation has been discovered under it. It is thought that it was moved about 8 to 13 miles, from an uncertain location.

Besides his description of the pillar, Führer made a detailed description of the remains of a monumental "Konagamana stupa" near the Nigali Sagar pillar, which was later discovered to be an imaginative construct. Führer wrote that "On all sides around this interesting monument are ruined monasteries, fallen columns, and broken sculptures", when actually nothing can be found around the pillar. In the following years, inspections of the site showed that there were no such archaeological remains, and that, in respect to Fuhrer's description "every word of it is false". It was finally understood in 1901 that Führer had copied almost word-for-word this description from a report by Alexander Cunningham about the stupas in Sanchi.

Kanakamuni Buddha

It is said that in this place the Kanakamuni Buddha, one of the Buddhas of the past, was born. The Asoka inscription engraved on the pillar in Brahmi script and Pali language attests the fact that Emperor Asoka enlarged the Kanakamuni Buddha's stupa, worshiped it and erected a stone pillar for Kanakamuni Buddha on the occasion of the twentieth year of his coronation.

Added to the doubts on the authenticity of the inscription, the very mention of a "divinized Buddha having been several time reborn" and preceded by other Buddhas such as Kanakamuni Buddha, inscribed on a pillar in a historical period as early as the 3rd century BCE, is considered by some authors as quite doubtful and problematic. Such complex religious constructions are generally considered as belonging to later stages of the development of Buddhism.

The Nigali Sagar Edict

The inscription, made when Emperor Asoka visited the site in 249 BCE and erected the pillar, reads:

{| class="wikitable centre"
|+ Nigali Sagar Edict
|-
! scope="col" align=left| Translation(English)!!Transliteration(original Brahmi script)!!Inscription(Prakrit in the Brahmi script)
|-
|align=center width="30%"|
{{blockquote|“His Majesty King Priyadarsin in the 14th year of his reign enlarged for the second time the stupa of the Buddha Kanakamuni and in the 20th year of his reign, having come in person, paid reverence and set up a stone pillar”.}}
| align=left |
|align=center width="10%"|

|}

Because of this dedication by Ashoka, the Nigali Sagar pillar has the earliest known record ever of the word "stupa" (here the Pali word Thube'').

There is also a second inscription, "Om mani padme hum" and "Sri Ripu Malla Chiram Jayatu 1234" made by King Ripu Malla in the year 1234 (Saka Era, corresponding to 1312 CE).

Accounts of the pillar

The Chinese pilgrims Fa-Hien (337 CE – c. 422 CE) and Xuanzang (602–664 CE) describe the Kanakamuni Stupa and the Asoka Pillar in their travel accounts. Xuanzang speaks of a lion capital atop the pillar, now lost.

A base of a Pillar of Ashoka has been discovered at Gotihawa, a few miles from Nigali Sagar, and it has been suggested that it is the original base of the Nigalar Sagar pillar fragments.

Gallery

References

See also
 Google location and photographs

Monuments and memorials in Nepal
Archaeological sites in Nepal
3rd-century BC establishments in Nepal
Buildings and structures in Kapilvastu District
Archaeological discoveries in Nepal